Senator Burdick may refer to:

Members of the United States Senate
Jocelyn Burdick (1922–2019), U.S. Senator from North Dakota in 1992
Quentin Burdick (1908–1992), U.S. Senator from North Dakota from 1960 to 1992

United States state senate members
Clark Burdick (1868–1948), Rhode Island State Senate
Ginny Burdick (born 1947), Oregon State Senate
Theodore Weld Burdick (1836–1898), Iowa State Senate
Zebulon P. Burdick (1806–1892), Wisconsin State Senate